During Vietnam's monarchial period, the Vietnamese nobility (tước) were classified into eleven classes, with names similar to their Chinese equivalent. These are listed here from the highest to the lowest, along with their equivalent European titles.

Terminology

Sovereigns 

Sovereign rulers (both Emperors and Kings) in general are referred to in Vietnamese as Vua (君, 𢁨, 𢂜, 𢃊, 𤤰, 𪻟, 𪼀, 󰅫, 󰅻).  This term, which can also be interpreted as "Patron", has no equivalent in Chinese languages, but comes from the indigenous Vietnamese vernacular and therefore had to be written in Nôm when used in court documents (which were typically written in Hán, i.e. classical Chinese). 
 
The Vietnamese monarchs usually carried the titles Vua and Hoàng Đế (皇帝) in parallel, with the former predominating among the general Vietnamese people and the latter at the imperial court.

Lords 

Both the Trịnh and Nguyễn lords, who nominally ruled the country from the 16th to the 18th century under the de jure control of the Revival Lê dynasty, used the title Chúa (主, "lord" / "prince"), which is outside of the classical hierarchy of nobility, this title is considered to be higher than Công and lower than Vương.

History 

The use of noble titles has existed in China since ancient times and the system of nobility used in Vietnam until 1945 dates back to the Zhou dynasty (Châu dynasty). The system of nobility employed by the Later Lê dynasty and later were directly based on the Chinese system used during the Ming dynasty period, this system would remain to be used in Vietnam until 1945 (as the August Revolution overthrew the Nguyễn dynasty), but had actually ceased in China in 1911 due to the Xinhai Revolution.

The noble titles of Vietnam can be divided into two categories: (A) Six titles which exclusively reserved for princes of imperial blood were, in ancient China, these were devolved to kings and tributary princes, as well as twelve other less important titles intended for the descendants of princes of imperial blood, with a reduction of "one degree for each successive generation". And (B) Five titles of nobility reserved for mandarins, regardless of origin (related to the Emperor or of popular origin), to reward merits, and, more particularly, military merits. These were given the five titles of "Công" (公), "Hầu" (侯),  "Bá" (伯), "Tử" (子), and "Nam" (男). Noble titles from both category A and B are transmissible to the eldest son of the nobleman, with a decrease of one degree with each successive generation.

After the establishment of protectorates over the Nguyễn dynasty by the French in the form of Annam and Tonkin the terminology used in the table above (as "European equivalent") was used by the French to designate dignitaries endowed with titles of nobility. While no protocol has regulated the matter of these designations, over 50 years of use have definitively enshrined these terms for translating Vietnamese noble titles.

Symbols 

Seals and other symbolic objects were also given to people after they received a noble title. For example after Léon Sogny received the title of "Baron of An Bình" (安平男) in the year Bảo Đại 14 (保大拾肆年, 1939) he was also given a golden seal and a  Kim Bài (金牌) with his noble title on it. The seal had the seal script inscription An Bình Nam chi ấn (安平男之印).

List of French people who have received a Vietnamese noble title during the French protectorate period 

After the French had established two protectorates in Vietnam, and by analogy with what was done for the Mandarins, titles of nobility were awarded by the Emperor of the Nguyễn dynasty to high-ranking French colonial officials. These noble titles which, formerly giving certain rights and privileges to the Vietnamese that received them, by the 1930s were reduced to being merely a simple pension, were considered to be purely honorary for the French officers who received them. In fact they would usually just receive a patent and a Kim Bài on which the title was engraved in Traditional Chinese characters.

Between the years 1885 and 1936 a total of 22 noble titles were awarded by the Vietnamese Emperor to French people. This group of people include a French minister, an admiral, two generals, nine governors general of Indochina, and nine senior residents of Annam.

List of senior French officials to whom a noble title had been awarded by the Imperial Court of the Nguyễn dynasty between 1885 and 1937:

See also 

 Chinese nobility 
 Royal and noble ranks of the Qing dynasty 
 Kazoku 
 Korean nobility 
 Styles and titles in the Joseon dynasty 
 Trần dynasty

References

Further reading 
R. B. Smith (1974). "Politics and Society in Viet-Nam during the Early Nguyen Period (1802–62)". Journal of the Royal Asiatic Society, 106 (2), pp 153–69.

External links

Nobility